Maitenbeth is a municipality in the district of Mühldorf in Bavaria in Germany.

Maitenbeth consists of 58 official localities:

References

Mühldorf (district)